The Mackay Base Hospital is the major hospital for the Central Queensland Region situated in Mackay, Queensland, Australia. The Hospital offers general services to a population of approximately 135 000 throughout Mackay and the surrounding areas including referrals from Moranbah and parts of the Bowen region. The Hospital has a wide range of medical and allied health services. The main referral hospitals are the Townsville Hospital ( away) and the Royal Brisbane and Women's Hospital ( away).

Redevelopment
In 2010-2014 the Mackay Base Hospital underwent a A$405 million redevelopment. The hospital redevelopment included increasing bed numbers from 163 to 318, adding more operating theatres, a dedicated Coronary Care Unit, a larger Intensive Care Unit, new emergency and outpatients' departments, renal support services, day oncology and a dental services unit, support services building and major services infrastructure, as well as an upgraded helipad and Carpark.
Woods Bagot, in association with Sanders Turner Ellick Architects of Mackay, is the architect, and Baulderstone is the managing contractor.
The first major area, Mental Health Inpatient Unit, was completed in August 2012. Following the completion of the new buildings the old hospital was demolished.

See also
 List of hospitals in Queensland
 List of hospitals in Australia

References

Hospitals in Queensland
Hospital buildings completed in 2012
Buildings and structures in Mackay, Queensland